David John Herman (born October 3, 1984) is a retired American mixed martial artist, who competed in the Heavyweight division of Titan FC, UFC, Bellator, EliteXC, World Victory Road, ShoXC, and Shark Fights. His nickname "Pee-Wee" is a reference of the character Pee-Wee Herman, created and portrayed by American comedian Paul Reubens.

Background
Herman was born in Columbia City, Indiana and raised in Fort Wayne, Indiana, attending Concordia Lutheran High School. At Concordia, Herman participated in various sports including football, track and field, and cross country. He also competed in wrestling for one month in his sophomore year before being expelled from the school. After taking his GED as a junior and spending a year at IPFW, Herman transferred to Indiana University at Bloomington, which has a Division I wrestling program. Despite having basically no high school wrestling experience, Herman competed for Indiana as a walk-on and excelled, competing for three full years and part of a fourth year. He red-shirted his first season which was from 2003–04 and held an impressive 28–9 record in his second season. He then claimed the exclusive starting role in his third season, holding a 28–16 record and qualifying for the NCAA tournament, in which he went 2–2. In a 2006 pre-season ranking, Herman was placed as high as eighth in the nation. In his fourth season Herman started off the season flawlessly, winning a tournament in November, but left a week later with no explanation for his departure, and later graduated from the university with a degree in general studies. Herman began training in mixed martial arts after watching one of his former college teammates train in the rising sport.

Mixed martial arts career

Early career
Following a 2–0 amateur career, Herman made his professional mixed martial arts debut on December 31, 2006. He quickly amassed an undefeated 11–0 record, fighting 10 times throughout 2007, and went 13–0 before actually joining an MMA gym and officially begin training.

In 2008, Herman signed with the now defunct EliteXC organization. He debuted on the undercard of EliteXC: Street Certified, defeating Mario Rinaldi via TKO. His second bout came at EliteXC: Return of the King, where he defeated Ron Waterman via TKO.  He next faced Kerry Schall in the main event of ShoXC 9, which would ultimately be the final show by the company.

Following the dissolution of EliteXC, Herman fought for a variety of promotions including Bellator Fighting Championships, Shark Fights and World Victory Road. Korean fighter Mu Bae Choi handed him his first loss in Japan on January 4, 2009, fighting in the Sengoku promotion. In his next fight Herman defeated Jim York at Sengoku 11.

In 2010, Herman became entangled in a lawsuit with Bellator that kept him out of action in the United States for just over a year. Once the legal issues were settled, Herman was scheduled to face Ricco Rodriguez at Bellator 31 but Rodriguez pulled out of the fight due to a knee injury. Michal Kita stepped in, and served as Rodriguez's replacement. Herman defeated him via first round submission.

Herman received his second loss after being disqualified for illegal knees to Rameau Thierry Sokoudjou. Herman then faced Yoshihiro Nakao at World Victory Road Presents: Soul of Fight. He won the fight via decision, the first fight in his career to go the distance.

Ultimate Fighting Championship
Herman was expected to make his promotional debut against Rob Broughton on June 11, 2011 at UFC 131. However, in late March, Broughton was replaced in the bout by Joey Beltran.

When Brock Lesnar pulled out of his main event fight with Junior dos Santos, Jon Olav Einemo's original opponent, Shane Carwin, stepped up to replace Lesnar against dos Santos.  Herman instead fought fellow UFC newcomer Einemo. Herman defeated Einemo via TKO (punches) at 3:19 of round 2 in a back and forth bout that earned Fight of the Night honors.

Herman was scheduled to face Mike Russow on October 8, 2011 at UFC 136. However, the bout was cancelled after Herman failed his preliminary drug test in which he tested positive for marijuana. Herman denies using the prohibited substances.

Herman fought against Stefan Struve on February 15, 2012 at UFC on Fuel TV 1. He lost the fight via TKO in the second round.

Herman replaced Gabriel Gonzaga to face Roy Nelson on May 26, 2012 at UFC 146. He was defeated via KO in 51 seconds.

Herman next faced Antônio Rodrigo Nogueira on October 13, 2012 at UFC 153. Herman was submitted by Nogueira via armbar in the second round, receiving the first submission loss of his career.

Herman tested positive for marijuana for the second time after failing his post-fight drug test for UFC 153. He was suspended for six months and ordered to undergo treatment. The suspension was lifted in April 2013.

Herman was expected to face Shane del Rosario on July 6, 2013 at UFC 162. However, del Rosario was forced off the card due to injury and replaced by Gabriel Gonzaga. Herman lost the fight just 17 seconds into the first round by TKO. After losing four fights in a row, Herman was released from the UFC.

Titan Fighting Championship
On January 28, 2014, it was announced that Herman had signed a contract with Titan Fighting Championship. 

Herman was expected to face Kalib Starnes at Titan FC 28 on April 25, 2014. However the event was delayed until May 16, 2014. He won the fight via unanimous decision.

Herman was expected to face Walt Harris at Titan FC 30 on September 26, 2014. However Harris was forced out of the bout with a back injury and the fight was then rescheduled to take place at Titan FC 32 on November 20, 2014. However the bout was scrapped after Harris re-signed with the UFC. Herman was then expected to face Jon Madsen for the Titan FC heavyweight championship at the event. On November 4, 2014 it was announced that Titan FC 32 would be postponed to December 19, 2014 and would be moved from Augusta, Georgia to Lowell, Massachusetts. Herman subsequently pulled out of the bout due to an injury.

Personal life
Herman married Madeleine Atchley in March 2014. They live on a farm and have a son, Leo.

On January 19, 2015 Herman was arrested in the early morning in Indiana, allegedly after leading police on a chase. Herman faces three felony charges, including resisting law enforcement with a vehicle and battery against law enforcement, and a misdemeanor charge of child neglect.  His infant child was in the vehicle when he pulled over in the closest safe well lit area.

According to an incident report issued by the Dekalb County Sheriff Department, Herman was speeding on I-69 with no headlights or taillights on. When officers attempted to pull him over, Herman initially refused to pull over before stopping at a gas station, the report states.

According to the report: “David exited his vehicle and approached Officers in an aggressive manner. David was given multiple warnings to get on the ground and failed to comply. David had to be tased in order to be taken into custody. An infant and adult female were also present in the vehicle.”

Championships and accomplishments
Ultimate Fighting Championship
Fight of the Night (One time)

Mixed martial arts record

|-
| Win
| align=center| 22–6
| Kalib Starnes
| Decision (unanimous)
|  Titan FC 28: Brilz vs. Davis
| 
| align=center| 3
| align=center| 5:00
| Newkirk, Oklahoma, United States
| 
|-
| Loss
| align=center| 21–6
| Gabriel Gonzaga
| KO (punches)
| UFC 162
| 
| align=center| 1
| align=center| 0:17
| Las Vegas, Nevada, United States
| 
|-
| Loss
| align=center| 21–5
| Antônio Rodrigo Nogueira
| Submission (armbar)
| UFC 153
| 
| align=center| 2
| align=center| 4:31
| Rio de Janeiro, Brazil
|  
|-
| Loss
| align=center| 21–4
| Roy Nelson
| KO (punch)
| UFC 146
| 
| align=center| 1
| align=center| 0:51
| Las Vegas, Nevada, United States
| 
|-
| Loss
| align=center| 21–3
| Stefan Struve
| TKO (punches)
| UFC on Fuel TV: Sanchez vs. Ellenberger
| 
| align=center| 2
| align=center| 3:52
| Omaha, Nebraska, United States
| 
|-
| Win
| align=center| 21–2
| John-Olav Einemo
| TKO (punches)
| UFC 131
| 
| align=center| 2
| align=center| 3:19
| Vancouver, British Columbia, Canada
| 
|-
| Win
| align=center| 20–2
| Yoshihiro Nakao
| Decision (unanimous)
| World Victory Road Presents: Soul of Fight
| 
| align=center| 3
| align=center| 5:00
| Tokyo, Japan
| 
|-
| Win
| align=center| 19–2
| Michal Kita
| Submission (omoplata)
| Bellator 31
| 
| align=center| 1
| align=center| 3:16
| Lake Charles, Louisiana, United States
| 
|-
| Loss
| align=center| 18–2
| Rameau Thierry Sokoudjou
| DQ (illegal knees)
| ADFC: Round 1
| 
| align=center| 2
| align=center| N/A
| Abu Dhabi, United Arab Emirates
| 
|-
| Win
| align=center| 18–1
| Jim York
| KO (axe kicks and punches)
| World Victory Road Presents: Sengoku 11
| 
| align=center| 1
| align=center| 2:25
| Tokyo, Japan
| 
|-
| Win
| align=center| 17–1
| Don Frye
| TKO (punches)
| Shark Fights 6: Stars & Stripes
| 
| align=center| 1
| align=center| 1:00
| Amarillo, Texas, United States
| 
|-
| Win
| align=center| 16–1
| Josh Barnes
| KO (knee and punches)
| Bellator 5
| 
| align=center| 1
| align=center| 4:46
| Dayton, Ohio, United States
| 
|-
| Loss
| align=center| 15–1
| Choi Mu-Bae
| TKO (punches)
| World Victory Road Presents: Sengoku no Ran 2009
| 
| align=center| 2
| align=center| 2:22
| Saitama, Japan
| 
|-
| Win
| align=center| 15–0
| Chris Guillen
| TKO (punches)
| KOK: Season's Beatings
| 
| align=center| 1
| align=center| 1:32
| Austin, Texas, United States
| 
|-
| Win
| align=center| 14–0
| Kerry Schall
| TKO (knees and punches)
| ShoXC 9
| 
| align=center| 1
| align=center| 1:06
| Hammond, Indiana, United States
| 
|-
| Win
| align=center| 13–0
| Ron Waterman
| TKO (punches)
| EliteXC: Return of the King
| 
| align=center| 1
| align=center| 2:19
| Honolulu, Hawaii, United States
| 
|-
| Win
| align=center| 12–0
| Mario Rinaldi
| TKO (knees and punches)
| EliteXC: Street Certified
| 
| align=center| 3
| align=center| 0:33
| Miami, Florida, United States
| 
|-
| Win
| align=center| 11–0
| Justin Kuhn
| Submission (rear-naked choke)
| Maximum Combat 
| 
| align=center| 1
| align=center| 2:56
| United States
| 
|-
| Win
| align=center| 10–0
| Chuck Geyer
| KO (punch)
| LOF 22: Nemesis
| 
| align=center| 1
| align=center| 1:31
| Indianapolis, Indiana, United States
| 
|-
| Win
| align=center| 9–0
| Terry Tucker
| KO (punch)
| LOF 20: Bitter Rivals
| 
| align=center| 1
| align=center| 0:36
| Indianapolis, Indiana, United States
| 
|-
| Win
| align=center| 8–0
| Jordan Wall
| TKO (submission to punches)
| Title Fighting Championships
| 
| align=center| 1
| align=center| 1:30
| Des Moines, Iowa, United States
| 
|-
| Win
| align=center| 7–0
| Andre Mussi
| TKO (punches)
| Fight Night in the Flats III
| 
| align=center| 1
| align=center| 3:00
| Cleveland, Ohio, United States
| 
|-
| Win
| align=center| 6–0
| James Samuels
| KO (punch)
| LOF 18: Pole Position
| 
| align=center| 1
| align=center| 0:18
| Indianapolis, Indiana, United States
| 
|-
| Win
| align=center| 5–0
| James Ferguson
| KO (punch)
| LOF 17: Unrivaled
| 
| align=center| 1
| align=center| 1:59
| Fort Wayne, Indiana, United States
| 
|-
| Win
| align=center| 4–0
| Seth Parker
| Submission (rear-naked choke)
| LOF: Revolution 4
| 
| align=center| 1
| align=center| 3:11
| Plainfield, Indiana, United States
| 
|-
| Win
| align=center| 3–0
| Greg Hammer
| TKO (submission to punches)
| FSG: Coliseum Carnage
| 
| align=center| 1
| align=center| 1:13
| Ames, Iowa, United States
| 
|-
| Win
| align=center| 2–0
| Jeff Orieze
| KO (punch)
| LOF: Revolution 2
| 
| align=center| 1
| align=center| 4:59
| Plainfield, Indiana, United States
| 
|-
| Win
| align=center| 1–0
| Mike Cooke
| KO (punch)
| LOF 12: Black Tie Battles
| 
| align=center| 1
| align=center| 1:39
| Indianapolis, Indiana, United States
|

References

External links
Official UFC Profile

http://www.daveherman.net/

American male mixed martial artists
Mixed martial artists from Indiana
Heavyweight mixed martial artists
Mixed martial artists utilizing collegiate wrestling
American sportspeople in doping cases
Doping cases in mixed martial arts
Living people
1984 births
People from Columbia City, Indiana
Sportspeople from Fort Wayne, Indiana
Sportspeople from Temecula, California
Ultimate Fighting Championship male fighters
American male sport wrestlers